Ivanilson Loforte Tique Da Silva (born 27 November 2002) is an English footballer who plays as a forward for  club Oldham Athletic.

Career
Having previously been at Bury, Da Silva joined Oldham Athletic on a two-year contract in the summer of 2019. He made his senior debut on 5 September 2020 as a substititute in a 3–0 EFL Cup victory at home to Carlisle United. Da Silva joined Curzon Ashton on a month-long loan on 12 December 2020. He made 2 league appearances for Curzon Ashton. In May 2021, Da Silva signed with the club on a professional contract until the end of the calendar year.

Career statistics

References

External links
 
 

2002 births
Living people
English footballers
Association football forwards
Oldham Athletic A.F.C. players
Curzon Ashton F.C. players
National League (English football) players
English Football League players
F.C. United of Manchester players
Ashton United F.C. players